The Haverford–Swarthmore rivalry is a rivalry between the Haverford Fords and Swarthmore Garnet Tide. It used to include college football. In other sports they are both members of the Centennial Conference. The 1894 game claims to have the first "action shot" photograph of a game. The winner of the contest was awarded the Hood Trophy. The two universities are in the same state of Pennsylvania.

References

College football rivalries in the United States
Swarthmore Garnet Tide
Haverford Fords